Oriodryas is a genus of moths belonging to the subfamily Olethreutinae of the family Tortricidae.

Species
Oriodryas olbophora Turner, 1925

See also
List of Tortricidae genera

References

External links
tortricidae.com

Tortricidae genera
Olethreutinae